Kalhor (Kurdish: Kelhûr), also spelled as Kalhur, may refer to the following:
Kalhor (tribe), a Kurdish tribe in Kermanshah Province
Kalhor, Ardabil, a village in Ardabil Province, Iran
Kalhor, East Azerbaijan, a village in East Azerbaijan Province, Iran
Kalhur, East Azerbaijan, a village in East Azerbaijan Province, Iran
Kalhor, Fars, a village in Fars Province, Iran
Kayhan Kalhor (1963- ), a Kurdish (from Iran) kamancheh player
Mirza Mohammad Reza Kalhor  (1245 - 1310 AH. / 1829 - 1892 AD), a 19th-century Iranian calligrapher of Kurdish origin